An esterase is a hydrolase enzyme that splits esters into an acid and an alcohol in a chemical reaction with water called hydrolysis.

A wide range of different esterases exist that differ in their substrate specificity, their protein structure, and their biological function.

EC classification/list of enzymes 
 EC 3.1.1: Carboxylic ester hydrolases
 Acetylesterase (EC 3.1.1.6), splits off acetyl groups
 Cholinesterase
 Acetylcholinesterase, inactivates the neurotransmitter acetylcholine
 Pseudocholinesterase, broad substrate specificity, found in the blood plasma and in the liver
 Pectinesterase (EC 3.1.1.11), clarifies fruit juices
 EC 3.1.2: Thiolester hydrolases
 Thioesterase
 Ubiquitin carboxy-terminal hydrolase L1
 EC 3.1.3: Phosphoric monoester hydrolases
 Phosphatase (EC 3.1.3.x), hydrolyses phosphoric acid monoesters into a phosphate ion and an alcohol
 Alkaline phosphatase, removes phosphate groups from many types of molecules, including nucleotides, proteins, and alkaloids. 
 Phosphodiesterase (PDE), inactivates the second messenger cAMP
 cGMP specific phosphodiesterase type 5, is inhibited by Sildenafil (Viagra)
 Fructose bisphosphatase (3.1.3.11), converts fructose-1,6-bisphosphate to fructose-6-phosphate in gluconeogenesis
 EC 3.1.4: Phosphoric diester hydrolases
 EC 3.1.5: Triphosphoric monoester hydrolases
 EC 3.1.6: Sulfuric ester hydrolases (sulfatases)
 EC 3.1.7: Diphosphoric monoester hydrolases
 EC 3.1.8: Phosphoric triester hydrolases
 Exonucleases (deoxyribonucleases and ribonucleases)
 EC 3.1.11: Exodeoxyribonucleases producing 5'-phosphomonoesters
 EC 3.1.13: Exoribonucleases producing 5'-phosphomonoesters
 EC 3.1.14: Exoribonucleases producing 3'-phosphomonoesters
 EC 3.1.15: Exonucleases active with either ribo- or deoxy-
 Endonucleases (deoxyribonucleases and ribonucleases)
 Endodeoxyribonuclease
 Endoribonuclease
 either deoxy- or ribo-

See also 
 Enzyme
 List of enzymes
 Carboxylic acid
 Ester
 Leukocyte esterase
 Hemagglutinin esterase
 Nuclease
 Lipase
 Asymmetric ester hydrolysis with pig-liver esterase

External links 
 Enzyme nomenclature

Hydrolases
Esters
 
Neurophysiology